Dyan (Dan, Dian, Dya, Dyane, Dyanu) is a Gur language of Burkina Faso. Zanga is either a divergent dialect or a closely related language.

References

Gur languages
Languages of Burkina Faso